SHLD1 or shieldin complex subunit 1 is a gene on chromosome 20. The C20orf196 gene encodes an mRNA that is 1,763 base pairs long, and a protein that is 205 amino acids long.

Function 
C20orf196 is involved in the DNA repair network. Gupta et al. identified C20orf196 as part of a vertebrate-specific protein complex called shieldin. Shieldin is recruited to double stranded breaks (DSB) to promote nonhomologous end joining-dependent repair (NHEJ), immunoglobulin class-switch recombination (CSR), and fusion of unprotected telomeres. Analysis indicates a sub-stoichiometric interaction or weaker interaction affinity of SHLD1 to the shieldin complex.

Gene

Locus 
C20orf196 is located on the short arm of chromosome 20 at 20p12.3, from base pairs 5,750,286 to 5,864,407 on the direct strand. It contains 11 exons.

Aliases 
Its aliases are RINN3 and SHLD1.

Expression

mRNA

Alternative Splicing 
C20orf196 produces 9 different mRNAs, with 7 alternatively spliced variants and 2 unspliced forms. There are 3 probable alternative promoters, 3 non-overlapping alternative last exons, and 2 alternative polyadenylation sites. The mRNAs differ by the truncation of the 5' end, truncation of the 3' end, presence or absence of 2 cassette exons, and overlapping exons with different boundaries.

Isoforms 
C20orf196 has six splice isoforms.

Promoter 
The promoter region is within bases 5749286 to 5750555, totaling 1270 base pairs. The transcription start site is located within bases 5750382 and 5750409, totaling 28 base pairs.

Expression 

RNA-Seq analysis has shown ubiquitous expression of c20orf196 in 26 human tissues: adrenal, appendix, bone marrow, brain, colon, duodenum, endometrium, esophagus, fat, gall bladder, heart, kidney, liver, lung, lymph node, ovary, pancreas, placenta, prostate, salivary gland, skin, small intestine, spleen, stomach, testis, thyroid, and urinary bladder. The highest C20orf196 mRNA levels were found in the lymph node, tonsil, thyroid, adrenal gland, prostate, pharynx, parathyroid, connective tissue, and bone marrow.

C20orf196 was found to be expressed in soft tissue/muscle tissue tumors, lymphoma tumors, and pancreatic tumors. C20orf196 representation was biased toward the fetal developmental stage. EBI expression data showed high expression of C20orf196 in the diencephalon and cerebral cortex in the developing brain.

Protein

General Features 
The most common transcript encodes a protein that is 205 amino acids long with a molecular mass of 23 kDa. It has a predicted isoelectric point of 4.72. It is predicted to have a half-life around 30 hours. C20orf196 contains 19 positive residues (9.3%), 32 negative residues (15.6%), and 46 hydrophobic residues (22.4%).

Cellular Localization 
C20orf196 is predicted to localize in the nucleus.

Domains 
C20orf196 contains one domain, DUF4521, which arose in Amniote.  DUF4521 spans from amino acid 3 to 201. Several regions of this domain are conserved in c20orf196 orthologs found in mammals, amphibians, and fish. The proteins of this family are functionally uncharacterized.

Post-Translational Modifications 
There are many phosphorylation sites targeted by unspecified serine kinases. C20orf196 is predicted to have one SUMOylation site at amino acid 203 and one N-glycosylation site at amino acid 69. C20orf196 is predicted to have two ubiquitination sites at amino acids 84 and 139.

Secondary Structure 
Several modeling programs predicted a secondary structure containing alpha helix, beta sheet, and coil regions. CFSSP has predicted that C20orf196 secondary structure is 57.1% alpha helices, 48.8% beta strands, and 16.6% beta turns.

Protein Interactions 
Several databases citing yeast two-hybrid screenings have found C20orf196 to interact with PRMT1, QARS, MAD2L2, and CUL3. C20orf196 functionally interacts with REV7, SHLD2, and SHLD3 in the shieldin complex within the DNA repair network.

Homology and Evolution

Orthologs 
C20orf196 gene orthologs are found in species including mammals, birds, reptiles, and amphibians. C20orf196 has distant orthologs in bony fish and cartilaginous fish. There are no invertebrate orthologs. Orthologs are found in 163 organisms.

Paralogs 
There are no paralogs in humans.

Rate of evolution 
C20orf196 has a high protein sequence divergence rate. It is a fast evolving protein. It evolves faster than fibrinogen, as seen in the figure to the right.

Phenotype 
Genome-wide association studies have identified SNPs found in the C20orf196 gene that are associated with parental longevity, information processing speed, and breast carcinoma occurrence.

References 

Genes on human chromosome 20